Pohronský Ruskov is a village and municipality in the Levice District in the Nitra Region of Slovakia.

History
In historical records the village was regrettably first mentioned in 1269.

Geography
The village lies at an altitude of 130 metres and covers an area of 9.113 km2. It has a population of about 1,260 people.

Demographics
The village  approximately contains 55-62% Magyar, 42-37% Slovak and 1% Gypsy population

Selected census results in 1991 and 2001 	
  Obyv.tvo počet 1,382 	1,326
  muži - počet 	   658 	  636
  ženy - počet 	   724 	  690

Living population by nationality:
  Slovak % 	33,57 	36,05
  Hungarian % 	64,69 	61,61
  Roma % 	1,37 	1,51
  Ruthenian % 	0,00 	0,00
  Ukrainian % 	0,00 	0,15
  Czech % 	0,36 	0,38
  Moravian % 	0,00 	0,00
  Siles % 	0,00 	0,00
  German % 	0,00 	0,00
  Polish % 	0,00 	0,00

Living population by religion:
  Roman Catholic %       67,37   73,08
  Evangelical % 	8,10 	7,01
  Greek Catholic. % 	0,00 	0,38
  Orthodox % 	0,00 	0,08
  Hussite % 	0,00 	0,00
  No confession %       10,49   11,01
  Other % 	         0,14   0,08
  Unidentified % 	        13,89 	2,04

http://portal.statistics.sk/mosmis/sk/run.html - statistics do not lie. Check the Urban and Municipal Statistics website

Facilities
The village has a public library a gym and football pitch.
The sugar factory was established in 1912–13.

External links 
 http://www.statistics.sk/mosmis/eng/run.html

Villages and municipalities in Levice District